Gilberto dos Santos Souza Júnior (born 20 October 1988, in Serrinha) known as Gilberto, is a Brazilian footballer who plays as a defensive midfielder.

Club career

Youth career
Gilberto began as a youth team player for Vitória in 2005 before moving to Bragantino in 2007 and to Corinthians B in 2008.

Mogi Mirim
For the 2009 Campeonato Paulista, Gilberto was acquired by Mogi Mirim and made his debut on January 24, 2009, in a 3–0 loss to Palmeiras. He played 6 games, starting 3 of them.

Hermann Aichinger
For the 2010 Campeonato Catarinense, Gilberto was acquired and made his debut on February 3, 2010, as he started in a 2–0 win over Brusque. He played 10 games while starting 8 of them.

Oeste
Later in 2010, Gilberto joined Oeste in
Série D. He made his debut on July 24, 2010, as a substitute in a 1–0 win over Esporte Clube São José. He played 2 games that season, starting the other one.

Marcílio Dias
In 2011, Gilberto joined Marcílio Dias for the Campeonato Catarinense. He started in his debut on January 16, 2011, in his team's 1–0 win over Imbituba Futebol Clube. He was a stand-out in the tournament  and played 18 games, starting 17 of them.

At this time, Gilberto's economic rights were held by agent, Eduardo Uram (70%), Marcílio Dias (15%) as well as the player himself (15%). Then, Tombense Futebol Clube acquired Gilberto's economic rights and began a series of loan deals while never having him actually play for the club.

Atlético Mineiro
After a successful stint in the Campeonato Catarinense, Atlético Mineiro acquired Gilberto on loan on May 4, 2011, for its upcoming 2011 season in Série A. In May 2011, Gilberto made his debut as a substitute for Atlético Mineiro in its 3–0 win over Clube Atlético Paranaense. On June 19, 2011, he made his debut as a starter for Atlético Mineiro in its 2–0 win over Atlético Clube Goianiense. He finished the season playing 6 games, starting 2 of them. On December 8, 2011, Atlético Mineiro decided not to renew the contract of Gilberto.

América (MG)
On December 23, 2011, Gilberto went on loan to América (MG). In the 2012 Campeonato Paulista, he played 4 games in the Campeonato Mineiro, starting one of them.

In the Campeonato Brasliero, he played one game (as a substitute in a 3–0 victory over Criciuma Esporte Clube) in Serie B before joining fellow Serie B team Clube de Regatas Brasil on loan.

CRB
On August 24, 2012, Gilberto moved on loan to CRB in Serie B in the Campeonato Brasileiro. He made his CRB debut as a substitute in a 1–0 loss against his former team, América (MG). He played 10 games, starting 8 of them.

Atlético Sorocaba
Gilberto joined Atlético Sorocaba on loan for the 2013 Campeonato Paulista. He played and started in 16 of the team's 19 games. On March 2, 2013, he scored his first career goal on an 86th minute game-winning penalty kick against his former team, Bragantino.

On July 23, 2013, Gilberto's contract termination with Tombense was filed with the Brazilian Football Confederation.

Philadelphia Union
On August 2, 2013, Gilberto was signed by Philadelphia Union in Major League Soccer.

Sacramento Republic FC
On March 12, 2014, USL Pro side Sacramento Republic FC announced that they had signed Gilberto for the 2014 season.

References

External links
 
 Philadelphia Union bio
 GaloDigital profile
 
 Confederation Brazil Football profile
 Brazil Soccer profile
 UOL Esporte profile
 
 Futbol365 profile
 Happy Punter profile
 FIFA12 profile

1988 births
Living people
Sportspeople from Bahia
Brazilian footballers
Brazilian expatriate footballers
Mogi Mirim Esporte Clube players
Oeste Futebol Clube players
Clube Atlético Mineiro players
América Futebol Clube (MG) players
Clube de Regatas Brasil players
Clube Atlético Sorocaba players
Philadelphia Union players
Sacramento Republic FC players
Association football midfielders
Expatriate soccer players in the United States
Campeonato Brasileiro Série A players
Campeonato Brasileiro Série B players
USL Championship players